The 1989 U.S. Women's Open was the 44th U.S. Women's Open, held July 13–16 at the Old Course of Indianwood Golf and Country Club in Lake Orion, Michigan, north of Detroit.

Betsy King won the first of her two consecutive titles, four strokes ahead of runner-up Nancy Lopez. It was the second of King's six major titles. With the win, her fifth in 1989, she became the first in the history of the LPGA Tour to exceed $500,000 in earnings for a single season.

Ending the third round on Saturday, King lost four shots on the last four holes and fell into the 54-hole co-lead with Patty Sheehan. The Sunday gallery was the largest to date at the U.S. Women's Open, exceeding 25,000, and King birdied the first hole on the way to a 68. Sheehan, a future champion in 1992 and 1994, carded a disappointing 79 and finished tied for 17th.

The championship returned to Indianwood five years later, in 1994, won by Sheehan.

Past champions in the field

Made the cut

Source:

Missed the cut

Source:

Round summaries

First round
Thursday, July 13, 1989

Source:

Second round
Friday, July 14, 1989

Source:

Third round
Saturday, July 15, 1989

Source:

Final round
Sunday, July 16, 1989

Source:

References

External links
U.S. Women's Open - past champions - 1989

U.S. Women's Open
Golf in Michigan
Sports competitions in Michigan
U.S. Women's Open
U.S. Women's Open
U.S. Women's Open
U.S. Women's Open
Women's sports in Michigan